John Thomas Moran (23 March 1919 – 27 May 1979) was an Australian rules footballer who played with North Melbourne in the Victorian Football League (VFL).

Notes

External links 

Jack Moran's playing statistics from The VFA Project

1919 births
1979 deaths
Australian rules footballers from Melbourne
West Melbourne Football Club players
North Melbourne Football Club players
Port Melbourne Football Club players
People from West Melbourne, Victoria